"School for Postmen" is a 1947 French short comedy film directed by Jacques Tati. Tati plays a French postman learning to be as fast as he can in delivering mail.  The film includes several sight gags that involve his bicycle. He replicated most of the action here in his first major feature film, Jour de fête, released two years later.

The 15-minute film is included on the Mon Oncle DVD, part of the Criterion Collection.

Cast
 Jacques Tati as Postman
 Paul Demange as Chief Postman

External links
 

1947 comedy films
Films directed by Jacques Tati
French black-and-white films
Films about postal systems
1947 short films
French comedy short films
1940s French films